A teeth-cleaning twig (in India: datun) is an oral hygiene tool made from a twig from a tree. It can help to prevent tooth decay and gum disease.

History
Chew sticks are twigs or roots of certain plants that are chewed until one end is frayed. This end can be used to brush against the teeth, while the other end can be used as a toothpick.  The earliest chew sticks have been dated to Babylonia in 3500 BCE and an Egyptian tomb from 3000 BCE; they are mentioned in Chinese records dating from 1600 BCE In the Ayurvedas around 4th century BCE and in Tipitaka, in the Buddhist Canon around the 5th century BCE in India.

The Indian way of using tooth wood for brushing is presented by the Chinese Monk Yijing (635–713 CE) when he describes the rules for Monks in his book:
 

A wide variety of plants can be used as dantakastha.

In Africa, chew sticks are made from the tree Salvadora persica, also known as the "toothbrush tree". In Islam, this tree is traditionally used to create a chew stick called miswak, as frequently advocated for in the hadith (written traditions relating to the life of Muhammad).

In South India, neem is used as a teeth cleaning twig. Neem, in full bloom, can aid in healing by keeping the area clean and disinfected.

Traditional Sikhs still use datun today as it is written in their scriptures:

Twigs used

Teeth-cleaning twigs can be obtained from a variety of tree species. Although many trees are used in the production of teeth-cleaning twigs, some trees are better suited to clean and protect the teeth, due to the chemical composition of the plant parts. The tree species are:

 Salvadora persica
 Sassafras
 Gumtree
 Lime tree (Citrusaurantafolia)
 Garcinia mannii in West Africa
 Orange tree (Citrus × sinensis)
 African laburnum (Cassia sieberiana)
 Tea tree
 Neem in the Indian subcontinent
 Vachellia nilotica, also called babool or kikar in the Indian subcontinent
 Dalbergia sissoo, also called sheesham in the Indian subcontinent
 Liquorice
 Gouania lupuloides
 Cinnamon
 Dogwood
 Olive
 Walnut
 Acacia catechu
 Acacia nilotica
 and other trees with bitter roots.

Europe and North America

 Apple
 Pear
 Bamboo
 Fig tree
 Hazelnut
 Willow
 Orange
 Lime
 Silver birch
 Olive
 Walnut 
 Liquorice root
 Nyssa sylvatica

Australia

 Mango
 Mangosteen

India

 Apamarga 
 Arjun 
 Bael 
 Bargad 
 Ber 
 Dhak 
 Gular 
 Jamun 
 Kamer 
 Karanj 
 Madar ak 
 Mango 
 Mulhatti 
 Neem 
 Peepal 
 Safed babul or Acacia
 Tejovati 
 Vijayasar

Carrying
Many companies produce special cases for carrying, storing and protecting chew sticks, known popularly as "miswak holders".

Advantages
When compared to toothbrushes, teeth-cleaning twigs have several advantages: 
 More ecological in its life-cycle
 Lower cost (0–16% of the cost of a toothbrush)
 Independence from external supplier if made at home from privately owned trees
 Low maintenance, with some twigs needing moistening with water if they become dry, to ensure the end is soft. The end may be cut afresh to ensure hygiene, and should not be stored near a sink. The twig is replaced every few weeks to maintain proper hygiene.
 No need for toothpaste

On the other hand, different species of trees have various levels of hardness just as synthetic toothbrushes would, so careful selection of the right hardness is required before use. Excessive scrubbing too can also bring the risk of gum damage, though this is a concern for plastic toothbrushes as well.

See also
 Ayurveda
 Babool (brand) of tooth paste in India, made from babool tree
 Miswak

References

Dental equipment
Oral hygiene
Cleaning and the environment
Ancient inventions
Egyptian inventions